Zhang Shuxian (Zhāng Shūxián) is a Chinese badminton player.

Career

Early career 
Zhang attended Luzhou Zilu Road School. Later, she was recommended by the city sports school to enter the Sichuan badminton team training, and was transferred to the Sichuan team as an official member in 2016, and was selected for China in the same year in national youth team. In July 2017, Zhang represented China for the first time in the international competition at the 2017 Asian Junior Championships and reached the quarter-finals of the women's doubles. She also participated at the World Junior Championships in 2017 and 2018, winning gold medals in the team event, and also bronze medals in the girls' (2017) and mixed doubles events (2018).

2022 
Starting from 2022, Zhang partnered with Zheng Yu and finished as the runners-up at the All England Open, Malaysia Open and Singapore Open, before finally winning the Australian Open. As a result, the pair qualified for the year-end final. They reached the semi-finals before bowing out to compatriots Chen Qingchen and Jia Yifan.

Achievements

World Junior Championships 
Girls' doubles

Mixed doubles

BWF World Tour (5 titles, 5 runners-up) 
The BWF World Tour, which was announced on 19 March 2017 and implemented in 2018, is a series of elite badminton tournaments sanctioned by the Badminton World Federation (BWF). The BWF World Tour is divided into levels of World Tour Finals, Super 1000, Super 750, Super 500, Super 300 (part of the BWF World Tour), and the BWF Tour Super 100.

Women's doubles

Mixed doubles

BWF International Challenge/Series (1 title, 2 runners-up) 
Women's doubles

Mixed doubles

  BWF International Challenge tournament
  BWF International Series tournament

BWF Junior International (2 titles, 2 runners-up) 
Women's doubles

Mixed doubles

  BWF Junior International Grand Prix tournament
  BWF Junior International Challenge tournament
  BWF Junior International Series tournament
  BWF Junior Future Series tournament

References

External links 
 

2000 births
Living people
People from Luzhou
Badminton players from Sichuan
Chinese female badminton players